Ellery Akers (born 1946) is an American writer and artist living on the Northern California Coast. She is the author of three poetry collections: Swerve: Environmentalism, Feminism, and Resistance; Practicing the Truth and Knocking on the Earth, as well as a children's novel, Sarah’s Waterfall.

Early life and education 
Akers is the daughter of Anthony B. Akers, an attorney and diplomat who served as U.S. Ambassador to New Zealand during the Kennedy Administration. Her maternal grandfather was architect John Russell Pope. Her sister, Andra Akers, was a character actress. Akers is a distant relative of William Ellery, a jurist and signer of the United States Declaration of Independence. Ellery received a B.A. from Radcliffe College and an M.A. from San Francisco State University.

Career 
Akers has won thirteen national writing awards, including the 2014 Autumn House Poetry Prize, the John Masefield Award, the Poetry International Prize, and Sierra magazine's Nature Writing Award. Her poetry has been featured on National Public Radio and American Life in Poetry and has appeared in such journals as The American Poetry Review, New York Times Magazine and The Sun.

She has taught writing at Cabrillo College, Humboldt State University, Skyline College, Squaw Valley Academy, and Foothill College. She has also taught private poetry workshops. Among her honors are fellowships from the MacDowell Colony, Ucross Foundation, and Headlands Center for the Arts.

Works 
 Swerve: Environmentalism, Feminism, and Resistance, Blue Light Press (January 24, 2020)
 Practicing the Truth, Autumn House Press, 2015 ISBN number
 Sarah's Waterfall: A Healing Story About Sexual Abuse,Safer Society Press, 2009 ISBN number
 Knocking on the Earth, Wesleyan University Press, 1989, ISBN number

Anthologies 
 The Place That Inhabits Us, Sixteen Rivers Press, 2010
 Short Takes: Model Essays for Composition, Elizabeth Penfield, Longman, 2006
 Inventions of Farewell: A Book of Elegies, Sandra M. Gilbert, Norton, 2001
 Stories From Where We Live: The California Coast, Sara St. Antoine, Milkweed,2001
 Intimate Nature: The Bond Between Women and Animals, Linda Hogan, Deena Metzger, and Brenda Peterson, Ballantine, 1998.

References

External links 
 www.elleryakers.com
 www.elleryakersartist.com
 www.poetryfoundation.org
 www.voiceseducation.org

Living people
1946 births
American women poets
Radcliffe College alumni
San Francisco State University alumni
21st-century American women